Caboolture was an electoral district of the Legislative Assembly in the Australian state of Queensland. It existed from 1977 to 2001 and centred on the community of Caboolture between Brisbane and the Sunshine Coast.

Members for Caboolture

Election results

See also
 Electoral districts of Queensland
 Members of the Queensland Legislative Assembly by year
 :Category:Members of the Queensland Legislative Assembly by name

References

Former electoral districts of Queensland
1977 establishments in Australia
Constituencies established in 1977
2001 establishments in Australia
Constituencies disestablished in 2001